Beloglottis costaricensis is a terrestrial species of orchid. It has a wide distribution, reported from Mexico (from San Luis Potosí south to Chiapas), Central America (all 7 countries), the West Indies (Trinidad, Dominican Republic and Cayman Islands), South America (Colombia, Venezuela, Suriname, Brazil, Ecuador, Peru, Bolivia), and Dade County Florida.

References

External links
Biota of North America Program, county distribution map, Beloglottis costaricensis 

Orchids of Florida
Orchids of Mexico
Orchids of Central America
Orchids of Belize
Flora of the Caribbean
Flora of the Dominican Republic
Orchids of South America
Spiranthinae
Flora without expected TNC conservation status